Elections for Runnymede Borough Council took place on 2 May 2019 alongside nationwide local elections. Due to changes to the ward boundaries, all 41 seats on the Council were up for election.

Results

Ward results

Addlestone North

Addlestone South

Chertsey Riverside

Chertsey St Ann's

Egham Hythe

Egham Town

Englefield Green East

Englefield Green West

Longcross, Lyne and Chertsey South

New Haw

Ottershaw

Thorpe

Virginia Water

Woodham and Rowtown

References

Runnymede Borough Council elections
2019 English local elections
May 2019 events in the United Kingdom
2010s in Surrey